The Centro Universitário Jorge Amado (Jorge Amado University Center, often abbreviated as Unijorge) is a private institution founded in 1999 and located in the city of Salvador, Bahia, Brazil.
It has more than 30 undergraduate courses and some post-graduate courses.

About the institution
Located in Salvador, Brazil, a colonial city in the northeastern part of the country, Unijorge is the largest private post-secondary institution in the State of Bahía. Founded 12 years ago, it serves around 20,000 students on its main campus (Paralela Avenue) and three branch campuses via face-to-face (Comércio & Plataforma) and distance learning mode of instruction also in other state (Curitiba/PR).

Unijorge provides undergraduate and graduate degrees as well as continuing education courses in fields including health care, education, technology, engineering, business and tourism, all accredited by the Ministry of Education. 15 percent of Unijorge’s students are enrolled in distance learning programs.

The institution has been recognized in a national survey for its quality of instruction in a distance learning modality by the Brazilian Association of Students in Distance Learning (ABE-EAD).

In 2006, Unijorge became a member of Whitney University System, an organization dedicated to expanding access to post-secondary education to Spanish- and Portuguese-speaking populations through collaborative relationships with Latin American universities.

Infrastructure
Unijorge has a modern campus comprising two buildings, located in the heart of Salvador.
 Digital Labs
 Science Labs
 Auditoriums for 680 people
 Sports facilities
 Radio, Photograph and TV studios
 Library

Exchange programmes
Unijorge has partnership programmes with institutions in Europe and Latin America, as well as with AIESEC and some Brazilian exchange agencies.

Partner schools
European University (EU) - Barcelona, Geneve, Montreux and Munich
Institución Universitaria Politécnico Grancolombiano - Bogotá (Colombia)
ISC Paris – School of Management - Paris (France)
Universidad Empresarial Siglo 21 - Córdoba (Argentina)
Universidade Mayor - Santiago (Chile)
Universidad de Viña del Mar (UVM) - Viña del Mar (Chile)
Universidad Anáhuac México Sur  - Mexico City (Mexico)
Universidad de Ibagué - Ibagué (Colombia)
University of Seville - Seville (Spain)
Universidad Sergio Arboleda - Bogotá (Colombia)
Universidad Privada Santa Cruz de la Sierra - Santa Cruz de la Sierra (Bolivia)
Escuela de Artes y Letras - Bogotá (Colombia)
Universidad de las Palmas de Gran Canaria - Las palmas de Gran Canaria (Spain)
Amiens School of Management - Amiens (France)
Escola de Arte e Superior de Deseño Ourense Antonio Failde - Ourense, Galícia (Spain)

External links
Portal Jorge Amado
Whitney International

Undergraduate programmes

Bachelor degree

Management- General
Management - Systems Analysis
Management - Finance
Management - Hospital
Management - Marketing
Architecture
Biological Sciences
Accounting
Social Communication - Journalism
Social Communication - Publicity and Advertisement
Social Communication - Radio & TV
Graphic Design
Law
Physical Education
Nursing
Engineering - Ambiental
Engineering - Civil
Engineering - Electrical
Engineering - Oil and Gas
Engineering - Production / Industrial
Engineering - Telecommunications
Physics
Physiotherapy
Speech Therapy
History
Nutrition
Psychology
International Relations
Information Systems
Tourism
Biological Sciences
Physics (Teaching)
Geography (Teaching)
History (Teaching)
English Language
Spanish Language
Portuguese Language
Mathematics
Pedagogy

References
http://www.unijorge.edu.br
http://www.whitneyintl.com/pt/home.aspx|publisher=Whitney International University System
https://web.archive.org/web/20120323144534/http://www.keyplan.com.br/noticias_geral/Whitney+injeta+RS+23+milhoes+na+Jorge+Amado.htm
https://web.archive.org/web/20110525015625/http://www.folhadoestudante.com.br/instituicoes/graduacao/unijorge
http://revistas.unijorge.edu.br/intercambio/index.php?option=com_content&view=article&id=55&Itemid=57

1999 establishments in Brazil
Universities and colleges in Salvador, Bahia
Educational institutions established in 1999